Skulte Port is the port authority of Zvejniekciems, Latvia.

References

External links 
 Skulte Port website

Ports and harbours of Latvia
Port authorities